Thomas E. Keane (September 29, 1905 - September 9, 1996) was an American politician.

Early life
Thomas Keane was born in Chicago, Illinois. He received his law degree from Loyola University Chicago and practiced law in Chicago. He served in the Illinois Senate from 1935 to 1945.

Chicago City Council
Mr. Keane served as the alderman of the 31st Ward of the City of Chicago. The son of alderman Thomas P. Keane and a member of the Democratic Party, he took his father's seat in the Chicago City Council in 1945, and represented part of the city's Northwest Side. Keane was once considered the second-most powerful politician in the city, exceeded only by his close personal ally Mayor Richard J. Daley. Mr. Keane's political career ended in 1974 with a federal conviction on mail-fraud and conspiracy charges related to real estate deals.

The United States Supreme Court subsequently held unconstitutional the portion of the mail-fraud law under which Mr. Keane was found guilty.

On October 2, 1996, the former alderman was posthumously honored for his "long distinguished career in the service of his community" by the full city council led by Mayor Richard M. Daley, the son of his late ally.

Death
Mr. Keane died, on September 9, 1996, at Our Lady of the Resurrection Medical Center, in Chicago, from heart failure, aged 90.

References 

Chicago City Council members
Politicians from Chicago
Lawyers from Chicago
Loyola University Chicago alumni
Democratic Party Illinois state senators
1905 births
1996 deaths
20th-century American politicians
Illinois politicians convicted of crimes
20th-century American lawyers